Western Avenue is a light rail station on the Metro Green Line in Saint Paul, Minnesota, United States. It is located along University Avenue on both sides of the intersection with Western Avenue. The station has split side platforms, with the westbound platform on the north side of the tracks west of Western and the eastbound platform on the south side of the tracks east of Western.

Along with Hamline Avenue Station and Victoria Street Station, this station was originally planned to be an infill station that would be built after the main line was constructed and if there was sufficient demand. However, significant political pressure and changes in the Federal Transit Administration's rules led to an early 2010 announcement that it would be built at the same time as the rest of the line.

Construction in this area began in 2012.  The station opened along with the rest of the line in 2014.

References

External links
Metro Transit: Western Avenue Station

2014 establishments in Minnesota
Metro Green Line (Minnesota) stations in Saint Paul, Minnesota
Railway stations in the United States opened in 2014